Lieutenant-Colonel Anthony Mildmay Julian Fane, 13th Earl of Westmorland, CBE, JP (16 August 1859 – 9 June 1922), styled Lord Burghersh between October 1859 and 1891, was a British peer.

Background and education
Fane was born at Curzon House, 8 South Audley Street, Mayfair, London, the second and youngest son of Francis Fane, 12th Earl of Westmorland and Lady Adelaide Ida, daughter of Richard Curzon-Howe, 1st Earl Howe. He was baptised at Apethorpe, Northampton. He was educated at Eton. He was fond of cricket, and although not in the Eleven whilst at Eton, he occasionally played for Northamptonshire under his title Lord Burghersh. On 3 August 1891, he succeeded his father in the earldom.

Military career
Lord Westmorland was appointed a major in the 3rd (Militia) battalion of the Northamptonshire Regiment, known as the Northampton and Rutland Militia, on 7 March 1900. He accompanied the 3rd Battalion of the Regiment to South Africa in April 1902, when they were posted there for the last stages of the Second Boer War. Following the end of the war in June 1902, Lord Westmorland and the other men of the 3rd battalion left Cape Town on the SS Scot in early September, and returned to Northampton after arrival in the United Kingdom later the same month. He was a Lieutenant-Colonel in the regiment from 1907 to 1914, and in 1911 he was appointed an Aide-de-Camp to King George V. He fought in the First World War as a Lieutenant-Colonel in the Lancashire Fusiliers, and was made a Commander of the Order of the British Empire (CBE) in 1919. He was also Justice of the Peace for Northamptonshire.

Family

On 28 May 1892, Lord Westmorland married his first wife Lady Sybil Mary St.Clair-Erskine, the daughter of Robert St Clair-Erskine, 4th Earl of Rosslyn and Blanche Adeliza Fitzroy. The wedding took place at St. Michael's Church, Chester Square, Belgravia, London. The countess was renowned for her beauty, and was connected with the group known as The Souls. She died on 21 July 1910 aged 38.

The couple had the following children:   
Lieutenant-Commander Vere Anthony Francis St.Clair Fane, 14th Earl of Westmorland (15 March 1893 – 12 May 1948) he married Hon. Diana Lister (daughter of Thomas Lister, 4th Baron Ribblesdale) on 7 June 1923. They have three children.
Lady Enid Victoria Rachel Fane (24 April 1894 – 9 September 1969) married Major The Honorable Henry Cecil Vane on 25 August 1914. She remarried Major Herbert Turnor on 1 September 1922. They had two daughters, Rosemary Sybil (9 September 1924 – 21 September 2015) and Pamela (born 22 May 1926) and through Rosemary, Enid was the maternal grandmother of Neil McCorquodale, husband of Lady Sarah Spencer (the elder sister of Diana, Princess of Wales).
Major the Hon. Mountjoy John Charles Wedderburn Fane (8 October 1900 – 9 October 1963), who married Agatha Acland-Hood-Reynardson on 29 April 1926. They had two children, Lt.-Cdr. Antony Charles Reynardson Fane (born 11 October 1927) and Daphne Sybil Fane (25 March 1929 – 23 January 2005).
Lady (Violet) Gloria Sybil Fane (11 April 1902 – 9 September 1969)

Due to financial difficulties, he sold the family seat, Apethorpe Hall, in 1904. It had been in his family for 300 years.

After the death of his first wife, Lord Westmorland married Catherine Louise Geale on 22 April 1916. The wedding took place at Herne Bay in Kent.  Catherine was the daughter of Reverend John Samuel Geale, and later a supporter of the British Fascists.

He died in Hove, Sussex on 9 June 1922, and was buried there on 14 June.

References

1859 births
1922 deaths
19th-century English nobility
20th-century English nobility
People educated at Eton College
Anthony
Earls of Westmorland
Barons Burghersh
People from Mayfair
Northamptonshire Regiment officers
Lancashire Fusiliers officers
British Army personnel of World War I
English justices of the peace